A Dangerous Affair is a 1931 American pre-Code 
mystery film directed by Edward Sedgwick and starring Jack Holt, Ralph Graves and Sally Blane.

Cast
 Jack Holt as Lt. McHenry 
 Ralph Graves as Wally Cook 
 Sally Blane as Marjory Randolph 
 Susan Fleming as Florence 
 Blanche Friderici as Letty Randolph 
 Edward Brophy as Nelson 
 DeWitt Jennings as City Editor 
 Tyler Brooke as Harvey 
 William V. Mong as Lionel 
 Fred Santley as Tom 
 Sidney Bracey as Plunkett 
 Charles Middleton as Tupper 
 Esther Muir as Peggy

Plot
Members of the Randolph family assemble to hear how millions of dollars will be distributed according to a will, but the attorney in charge is murdered. A police lieutenant eventually finds the murderer in a film that Harrison's Reports said included "every known device to hold the spectator in breathless suspense — trap doors, mysterious murders and disappearances, screams, and bony arms protruding from behind half-closed doors, grabbing unsuspecting victims by the throat ...".

References

Bibliography
 Michael Zmuda. The Five Sedgwicks: Pioneer Entertainers of Vaudeville, Film and Television. McFarland, 2015.

External links
 

1931 films
1931 mystery films
1930s English-language films
American mystery films
Films directed by Edward Sedgwick
Columbia Pictures films
1930s American films